Careem is a Dubai-based super app with operations in over 100 cities, covering 12 countries across the Middle East, Africa, and South Asia regions. The company, which was valued at over  billion in 2018, became a wholly-owned subsidiary of Uber after being acquired for $3.1 billion in January 2020. Careem expanded into the food delivery business with Careem Now in November 2018 and launched a digital payment platform, Careem Pay in April 2022.

History
Careem was founded by Mudassir Sheikha, an American of Pakistani origin and Magnus Olsson of Sweden, who had both worked as management consultants at McKinsey & Company. It started operating in July 2012 as a website-based service for corporate car bookings, and evolved to become a ridesharing company with car hire for everyday use.

In 2015, the company acquired a Saudi-based home service company and Abdulla Elyas joined Careem. In 2017, the company announced a program to extend maternity leave and hire more women.

In June 2017, Careem launched operations in Palestine as part of a commitment to create one million jobs in the MENA region by the end of 2018. In January 2018, they became the first ride-hailing service to launch in Baghdad. The company also has locations in Najaf and Erbil, Kurdistan Region.

It was announced in February 2018, that Careem has acquired RoundMenu, a restaurant listing and food ordering platform that operates across the Arab world. In August 2018, Careem said they would be launching bus services, starting with cities in Egypt in December of the same year. The service was discontinued in early 2020.

In May 2019, Careem announced the acquisition of UAE-based bike-sharing startup Cycle which will re-brand as Careem Bike.

In April 2021, Careem launched Careem Pay, a digital wallet for money transfers and withdrawals in the UAE.

In June 2022, Careem suspended food delivery service in Pakistan over unfavorable economic conditions.

Funding
Careem received seed money of  million in a round led by STC Ventures in 2013. In 2014, it received funding of  million in a Series B round led by Al Tayyar Travel Group and STC Ventures.

In November 2015, Careem announced a Series C round investment of  million led by The Abraaj Group. In October 2016, the company reached an agreement with regulators in Dubai whereby customers are able to book all taxicabs and limousines operating in Dubai via the Careem mobile app. In December 2016, the company raised  million in a Series D round, based on a  billion valuation for the company. Saudi Telecom in this funding round invested in a 10% stake in Careem. In October 2018, the company secured  million funding from its existing investors.

On 26 March 2019, Uber agreed to acquire the company for  billion, including  billion in cash and  billion in convertible notes, making Careem the first unicorn startup company in the Middle East outside of Israel.

Careem Now
In 2018, Careem announced it was launching a food delivery service app called Careem Now, delivering food and pharmaceuticals, initially in Dubai and Jeddah. In 2019, the service expanded into Riyadh and Amman, and announced it was also launching in Pakistan. On 21 April 2020, the service expanded its Dubai service into delivering groceries and other essential products.

On 4 May 2020, Uber Eats announced they were exiting the United Arab Emirates and that their services would be offered through Careem Now.

Women 
In Pakistan, Careem employs women drivers. Women are also employed as drivers in Egypt and Jordan. In Saudi Arabia, women make up 80% of the company's customers. Careem is planning to have a female workforce of 20,000 by the year 2020. In Saudi Arabia, Careem and Uber have started recruiting women, as part of the Saudi Women to drive movement. Women were legally allowed to start driving on 24 June 2018, and Uber and Careem women drivers were able to start working on the same day.

Layoffs
Due to the impact of the ongoing coronavirus pandemic, Careem announced on its blog it was laying off 31% of its workforce, amounting to 536 employees.

Criticism

Regulations

Taxi protests in Egypt
Uber and Careem faced heavy criticism in Egypt at the beginning of 2016 by local taxi drivers for operating without official taxi licenses. Taxi drivers organized several protests and sit-ins demanding that the Egyptian government intervene to halt the activities of the TNCs. A committee was organized by the Egyptian government to assess the complaints of the protesting taxi drivers and standardize taxi services in Egypt. They ruled in favor of the TNCs, ensuring that they can operate legally and provided legal protection for the TNC drivers who had been facing attacks by both state police and angry taxi drivers.

Data breach
In January, 2018, Careem discovered data on more than 14 million riders and 558,800 drivers  were breached. The company waited until late April, 2018, to disclose this breach because they "wanted to make sure we had the most accurate information before notifying people". According to investigations conducted by the company, there was no initial evidence of fraud or misuse.

Charity work
Careem has been a supporter of Cricket for a Cause for the past two years and has supported the league's efforts to raise funds for children in developing nations. Moreover, in Pakistan, Careem and Robin Hood Army took the initiative to feed more than 10,000 people across the nation.

See also
 Gojek
 Lyft
 Ola Cabs

References

External links
 

Uber acquisitions
Carsharing
Location-based software
Transport companies established in 2012
Companies based in Dubai
2019 mergers and acquisitions
Emirati companies established in 2018